The Eastern Berber languages are a group of Berber languages spoken in Libya and Egypt. They include Awjila, Sokna and Fezzan (El-Fogaha), Siwi and Ghadamès, though it is not clear that they form a valid genealogical group.

Eastern Berber is generally considered as part of the Zenatic Berber supergroup of Northern Berber.

Classification
Kossmann (1999:29, 33) divides them into two groups:
 one consisting of Ghadamès and Awjila. These two languages are the only Berber languages to preserve proto-Berber *β as β; elsewhere in Berber it becomes h or disappears.
 the other consisting of Nafusi (excluding Zuwara and southern Tunisia), Sokna (El-Foqaha) and Siwi. This shares some innovations with Zenati, and others (e.g. the change of *ă to ə and the loss of *β) with Northern Berber in general.

Blench (ms, 2006) lists the following as separate languages, with dialects in parentheses; like Ethnologue, he classifies Nafusi as Eastern Zenati.

Siwa
Awjila
Sokna †
Ghadamès
Zurg †

The "Lingvarium Project" (2005) cites two additional languages: the extinct language of Jaghbub and the still-spoken Berber language of Tmessa, an oasis located in the north of the Murzuq District. Blažek (1999) considers the language spoken in Tmessa as a dialect of Fezzan.

Notes

External links
 "Oriental Berber", a collaborative blog on the Berber languages of Tunisia, Libya, and Egypt

Eastern Berber languages
Berber languages
Berbers in Egypt
Berbers in Libya
Languages of Egypt
Languages of Libya